s raced 
Timothy David Jones (born 1 August 1975 in Harare) is a Zimbabwean former professional road racing cyclist.

His most notable victories are stage 3 of the 2003 Settimana Ciclista Lombarda, Tour of Slovenia (1999), Giro del Capo (1998) in South Africa and the 2001 Giro dell'Etna in Italy where he beat Davide Rebellin and Ivan Basso. He is the first Zimbabwean to compete in a Grand Tour, finishing 73rd in the 2001 Giro d'Italia. Jones brother, Nathan represented Zimbabwe at the 1991 Cycling Junior World Championships that were held in Colorado. His youngest brother Adam is a notable publisher and editor of Wealth Magazine in Botswana. He is also the brother-in-law of Italian cyclists Antonio and Ivan Fanellii.

In the late 1990s Jones tested positive for elevated levels of hematocrit.

Major Results

1998
1st  Time trial, National Road Championships
1st  Overall Giro del Capo
1st Stage 4
 8th Overall Tour de l'Ain
 10th Overall Vuelta a Asturias
1999
1st  Overall Tour of Slovenia
1st Stage 5 
 3rd Overall Uniqa Classic
 7th Overall Giro del Trentino
2001
1st Giro dell'Etna
1st Stage 3 Settimana Ciclistica Lombarda
2003
 2nd Overall Settimana Ciclistica Lombarda
1st Stage 3 
 3rd Gran Premio Industria e Commercio Artigianato Carnaghese
 6th Overall Tour of Slovenia
 7th Overall Giro della Liguria
 7th Gran Premio de Llodio
 9th Overall Giro d'Abruzzo
2004 
 2nd Overall Settimana Ciclistica Lombarda
 4th Overall Giro d'Abruzzo
 8th Overall Settimana Internazionale di Coppi e Bartali
2006 
 2nd Overall Circuito Montañés
2007
 1st Maratona dles Dolomites
2010
 1st Providence Cyclo-cross

See also
 Zimbabwe Cycling Federation

References

External links

Sportspeople from Harare
White Zimbabwean sportspeople
Zimbabwean male cyclists
Cyclists at the 1994 Commonwealth Games
Commonwealth Games competitors for Zimbabwe
Cyclists at the 1996 Summer Olympics
Olympic cyclists of Zimbabwe
1975 births
Living people
Alumni of St. George's College, Harare